Vishnupuram Ilakkiya Vattam is a literary organization created by Tamil writer Jeyamohan and his readers and fans. It is named after his noted work Vishnupuram. It is currently based out of Coimbatore in Tamil Nadu, India and is being coordinated by K.V.Arangasamy. It awards the Vishnupuram Award every year.

Purpose
The Vattam was created in 2009 with the purpose of promoting quality literature among the Tamil community in the world and to create attention for high quality writing and writers. To that effect, the organization periodically conducts literary meetups, seminars, conferences and informal gatherings to discuss literary works and other arts.

In 2010, the Vishnupuram Ilakkiya Vattam instituted the annual Vishnupuram Award that recognizes under-recognized stalwarts of Tamil literature.

Events organized by Vishnupuram Ilakkiya Vattam

Vishnupuram Award ceremonies
 Vishnupuram Award for Aa Madhavan (2010)
 Vishnupuram Award for Poomani (2011), Coimbatore
 Vishnupuram Book Reading Colloquium (2012), Karaikudi
 Vishnupuram Award for poet Devadevan (2012), Coimbatore
 Vishnupuram Award for Srilankan Tamil writer Thelivathai Joseph (2013), Coimbatore
 Vishnupuram Award for poet Gnanakoothan (2014), Coimbatore
 Vishnupuram Award for poet Devathachan (2015), Coimbatore
 Vishnupuram Award for Writer Vannadasan (2016). Coimbatore
 Vishnupuram Award for Writer C.Muthusamy (2017). Coimbatore
 Vishnupuram Award for Writer Raj Gauthaman (2018) Coimbatore
 Vishnupuram Award for poet Abi (Habibullah) (2019) Coimbatore
 Vishnupuram Award for writer Sureshkumara Indrajith (2020) Coimbatore
 Vishnupuram award for poet Vikramadityan (2021) - announced

Literary Conferences
 Kalapria Padaippukkalam (2010), Coimbatore, Critical review of the creative world of poet Tk Kalapria
 Ooty Poetry Conference (2010), Narayana Gurukulam, Ooty Coimbatore
 Devadevan Poetry Conference (2011), Thiruparappu
 Ooty Conference on Epics (2011), Narayana Gurukulam, Ooty
 Devadevan Poetry Conference (2011), Thiruparappu
 Yuvan Chandrasekhar Poetry Conference (2011), Kanyakumari
 Vishnupuram Book Reading Colloquium (2012), Karaikudi
 Ooty Literature Conference (2012), Narayana Gurukulam, Ooty
 Kalpetta Narayanan Poetry Conference (2012), Alappuzha
 Literature Conference (2013), Yercaud
 Conference on Venmurasu (2014), Munnar
 Ooty Literature Conference (2014), Narayana Gurukulam, Ooty

Felicitation Events
 Nanjilnadan Felicitation (2011), Chennai
 Felicitation event for writer Poomani on winning the Sahitya Academy Award (2015), Chennai

Others
 Venmurasu books release event (2014), Chennai

References

External links
 Vishnpuram Ilakkiya Vattam website -https://vishnupuramvattam.in/
 Jeyamohan website - http://www.jeyamohan.in

Indian writers' organisations
Tamil-language literature